Clement Steele Clarke (October 9, 1897 – March 28, 1967), was an oilman from Shreveport, Louisiana, who was the first member of the Louisiana Republican Party to run for the United States Senate since implementation in 1914 of the Seventeenth Amendment to the United States Constitution. He lost the 1948 race to Democrat Russell B. Long, the older son of Huey Pierce Long Jr.

Clarke's first marriage was to Marjorie Terry, daughter of Dr. Roy A. Terry of Long Beach, California. The couple wed on July 13, 1934. The couple soon divorced, and Marjorie Clark married Donald Ballard on December 22, 1936.

References

1897 births
1967 deaths
Politicians from Marietta, Ohio
People from Beaumont, Texas
People from Collier County, Florida
Cornell University College of Engineering alumni
American businesspeople in the oil industry
Louisiana Republicans
Louisiana postmasters
Politicians from Shreveport, Louisiana
United States Navy officers
Burials in Louisiana
20th-century American inventors
Military personnel from Texas